Hasan Ali Kaldırım (born 9 December 1989) is a Turkish professional footballer who plays as a left wingback. He is also an international footballer, having earned caps for the Turkey U-19, U-20, and U-21 levels.

Early years
Born to Turkish parents from Isparta, Kaldırım began playing football at the age of three. He came through the youth ranks of TuS Koblenz before moving to 1. FC Kaiserslautern in 2006. Starting out with the U19 squad, Kaldırım was promoted to the reserve squad at the start of the 2008–09 season. Kaldırım joined 1. FSV Mainz 05 the following season, citing Jörn Andersen's confidence in him as the catalyst for the move. With Mainz 05, Kaldırım made 19 appearances for the reserve team. Six months after his transfer, he was transferred again to Kayserispor.

Club career

Kaldırım made his professional debut for Kayserispor on 6 February 2010 against Galatasaray. In his first season, he played six matches. In his second season, he made progress and played in 15 games. In his third year with Kayserispor, Kaldırım became a regular starter and played in 33 matches. Because of his good performance at Kayserispor, he was called up for the Turkey national football team. He played four consecutive friendly games during his first call-up and showed good performances. His performance was good enough to impress Turkish club Fenerbahçe.

Kaldırım joined Fenerbahçe from Kayserispor on 22 June 2012 on a five-year contract for a fee of €6,750,000. He scored the first goal of his senior career in a league game in the Süper Lig against Galatasaray on 16 December 2012. In the first half of his first season for Fenerbahçe he was the team's main left back however, in the 2013–14 season, Michal Kadlec became the regular left back.

International career
Kaldırım began his international career with the Turkey U-19 squad, scoring a goal in his only cap. He has also been capped at U-20, U-21, and A2 levels.

Personal life
Kaldırım has two younger siblings: one brother and one sister, both footballers. He enjoys watching tennis and Formula 1 racing.

Career statistics

Club

International goals
Scores and results list Turkey's goal tally first.

Honours
Fenerbahçe
Süper Lig: 2013–14 
Turkish Cup: 2012–13
Turkish Super Cup: 2014

References

External links
 
 

1989 births
Living people
Turkish footballers
Turkey international footballers
Turkey under-21 international footballers
Turkey youth international footballers
Turkey B international footballers
German footballers
German people of Turkish descent
TuS Koblenz players
1. FC Kaiserslautern II players
1. FSV Mainz 05 II players
Kayserispor footballers
Süper Lig players
Association football fullbacks
Fenerbahçe S.K. footballers
İstanbul Başakşehir F.K. players
People from Neuwied
Footballers from Rhineland-Palatinate